Wadi Al Disah is a mountainous area located in the southwest Province of Tabuk, Saudi Arabia. It is 4000 square meters away from Tabuk. Wadi Al Disah is mainly located in the Prince Mohammed bin Salman Natural Reserve. The weather of the area is warm during summers and mild during winter which makes it a suitable area for planting. The village of Disah itself has many ancient remains that are traced back to the Nabateen era. As Al Disah has a number of ancient buildings, many of those buildings contain Arabic writings.

Development Project 
In an aim at boosting tourism is Saudi Arabia, the Public Investment Fund (PIF) has launched a development project to improve Wadi Al Disah and prepare it for local and international tourism. The project opts to make the area the most environmental diversified destination in Saudi Arabia.

References 

Valleys of Saudi Arabia